Wang Ruikai (pinyin: Wāng Ruìkǎi; Wade-Giles: Wang Jui-k'ai) (? - January 24, 1941) was a politician in the Republic of China. He was Governor of Zhejiang during the Reformed Government of the Republic of China and the Wang Jingwei regime (Republic of China-Nanjing). He was born in Xuyi, Anhui.

Biography 
In 1912 Wang Ruikai was appointed as the first Governor of Jiangxi. When the Second Revolution broke out, he resigned his post; his resignation was in April 1914). In 1916 he was appointed as Councilor of the National Council.

In March 1938 Liang Hongzhi established the Reformed Government of the Republic of China; Wang Ruikai also participated in it. That May, the Zhejiang Provincial Government was established and Wang was appointed the first Governor of Zhejiang. In March 1940 the Wang Jingwei regime was established; Wang Ruikai stayed in his former position. That October, the Governorship of Zhejiang was renamed to the Chairmanship of Zhejiang since the system of provincial government was changed to the committee system. Wang Ruikai was appointed the Chairman of Zhejiang and thus kept his former position.

Wang Ruikai died while holding his post on January 24, 1941.

References 
 

Politicians from Huai'an
Republic of China politicians from Jiangsu
Chinese collaborators with Imperial Japan
1941 deaths
Governors of Jiangxi
Year of birth missing